Simon Josef Brandhuber (born 27 June 1991) is a German weightlifter. He is a two-time silver medalist at the European Weightlifting Championships.

At the 2019 European Weightlifting Championships held in Batumi, Georgia, he won the silver medal in the men's 67kg event.

In 2020, he won the silver medal in the men's 67kg event at the Roma 2020 World Cup in Rome, Italy. He competed in the men's 61kg event at the 2020 Summer Olympics in Tokyo, Japan.

He won the silver medal in the men's 61kg event at the 2022 European Weightlifting Championships held in Tirana, Albania.

References

External links 
 

Living people
1991 births
Place of birth missing (living people)
German male weightlifters
European Weightlifting Championships medalists
Competitors at the 2017 Summer Universiade
Weightlifters at the 2020 Summer Olympics
Olympic weightlifters of Germany
21st-century German people